Upper Ouachita National Wildlife Refuge  was established in 1978 and is located in Union and Morehouse Parishes in northern Louisiana.

Wildlife and habitat
About 80% of the refuge is subject to annual flooding from December through May.

The central physical feature is the Ouachita River, which bisects the refuge. The river's wide floodplain is characterized by alluvial soils. Refuge supports concentrations of ducks, geese, wading birds, raptors and a small wintering population of bald eagles.

The refuge provides excellent wintering habitat for tens of thousands of ducks and geese. The endangered red-cockaded woodpecker and the threatened Louisiana black bear are found on Upper Ouachita NWR. Other wildlife species that call the refuge home include alligators, deer, turkey, squirrels, bald eagles and beaver. Upper Ouachita NWR is one of the four refuges managed in the North Louisiana Refuge Complex.

Management
Selective thinning and water level manipulation is conducted within the bottomland hardwoods for the benefit of migratory birds, resident wildlife and the overall health of the forest. Reforestation of bottomland hardwoods has taken place on the east side of the refuge. Emphasis was placed on planting the tree species that grew there historically.
Approximately  of the refuge are managed as moist soil units. These wetland units are managed for the benefit of waterfowl, shorebirds and other wildlife. Water levels are manipulated to produce high quality natural foods such as wild millets, grasses and sedges. Cooperative farming occurs on a rotational basis in portions of the refuge to provide food for wintering waterfowl.

The upland mixed pine hardwood forest on the western portion of the refuge is managed for the endangered red-cockaded woodpecker through thinning and prescribed fire. Installing artificial cavity inserts and woodpecker banding and occasional transplanting are also important management tools. Other management practices include wood duck nest box project, fish stocking, and removal of exotic, invasive plants and animals.

See also
 List of National Wildlife Refuges: Louisiana

References

}}

External links
 Upper Ouachita National Wildlife Refuge

Protected areas of Morehouse Parish, Louisiana
National Wildlife Refuges in Louisiana
Protected areas of Union Parish, Louisiana
Protected areas established in 1978
1978 establishments in Louisiana
Wetlands and bayous of Louisiana
Landforms of Morehouse Parish, Louisiana
Landforms of Union Parish, Louisiana
Ouachita River